The 2010–11 Skeleton World Cup was a multi race tournament over a season for bob skeleton. The season started on 25 November 2010 in Whistler, Canada, and ended on 4 February 2011 in Cesana, Italy. The World Cup was organised by the FIBT who also ran world cups and championships in bobsleigh. This season was sponsored by Viessmann.

Calendar 
Below is the schedule of the 2010/11 season.

Results

Men

Notes
Note 1:  Ben Sandford's bronze medal at the St. Moritz World Cup race was New Zealand's first ever World Cup medal.

Women

Standings

Men

Women

References

External links
FIBT

Skeleton World Cup
Skeleton World Cup, 2010-11
Skeleton World Cup, 2010-11